Kotze or the accented Kotzé is an Afrikaans surname and may refer to:

Kotze
 Alta Kotze (born 1971), South African cricketer
 Johannes Kotze (1879–1931), South African cricketer

Kotzé
 Björn Kotzé (born 1978), Namibian cricketer
 Deon Kotzé (born 1973), Namibian cricketer
 Elize Kotzé, head coach of the South Africa national netball team
 John Gilbert Kotzé (1849–1940), South African jurist
 Theuns Kotzé (born 1987), Namibian rugby union player

See also 
 Coetzee

Afrikaans-language surnames
Surnames of French origin